This is a list of Foucault pendulums in the world:

Europe

Austria
 Technisches Museum Wien, Vienna
 St. Ruprecht an der Raab, Styria, erected in 2001 in a slim stainless steel pyramid, partially with glass windows; it is worldwide the first to exist outside a closed building: on the street. - Length: 6.5 m, weight: 32 kg

Belarus
 Belarus State Pedagogic University, Minsk

Belgium
 Volkssterrenwacht Mira, Grimbergen
 Technopolis, Mechelen
 Festraetsstudio, Sint-Truiden
 UGent-volkssterrenwacht Armand Pien Ghent

Bulgaria
 Public Astronomical Observatory and Planetarium "Nicolaus Copernicus", Varna - Length: 14.4 m

Czech Republic
 Observatory and Planetarium Hradec Králové, Hradec Králové - Length: 10 m, weight: 8.5 kg
 Czech Technical University, Prague - Length: 21 m, weight: 34 kg
 Rotunda in Castle Flower Garden, Kroměříž - Length: 25 m, weight: 30 kg

Denmark
 Steno Museet, Aarhus
 Odense Technical College, Odense
 Geocenter, Faculty of Science, University of Copenhagen - Length 25 m, weight: 145 kg

Estonia
 Department of Physics, University of Tartu

Finland
 Department of Physics, University of Turku, Turku
 Eurajoki - Length: 40 m, weight: 110 kg
 Finnish Science Centre Heureka, Vantaa
 The watertower of Kuusamo

France

Germany
 Jahrtausendturm, Magdeburg
 Gymnasium Lünen-Altlünen, Lünen
 Gymnasium Verl, Verl
 German Museum of Technology, Berlin
 University of Bremen
 University of Heidelberg
 Helmholtz-Gymnasium Heidelberg
 Hochschule für Angewandte Wissenschaften Hamburg, Hamburg
 School for Business and Technique, Mainz
 Deutsches Museum, Munich - Length: 30 m, weight: 30 kg
 University of Munich, Geophysics – Department of Earth and Environmental Sciences, 20 m, 12 kg, live webcam, description
 Münster, 48 kg, 29 m, with mirrors, Zwei Graue Doppelspiegel für ein Pendel by artist Gerhard Richter in a former church, opened 17 June 2018
 University of Osnabrück, Osnabrück, Lower Saxony - Length: 19.5 m, weight: 70 kg
 Gymnasium of the city Lennestadt, North Rhine-Westphalia - Length: 11 m, weight: 50 kg, period: 6.7 s
 Cornelsen Verlag publishing house, Berlin
 Hochschule für Angewandte Wissenschaften, Schweinfurt
 University of Trier
 University of Konstanz - N library 
 University of Regensburg Physics Building PHY9, 18 m, stainless steel sphere diameter 0.12 m, electromagnetic drive, Charron ring 0.8 m below attachment.
 University of Rostock
 University of Greifswald
 Astronomisch physikalisches Kabinett, Kassel
 University of Göttingen, Physics department
 University of Wuppertal

Hungary
 Eötvös Loránd University, Budapest, in one of the Lágymányosi buildings
  Mures-Breda castle

Iceland
 Orkuveita Reykjavíkur, Reykjavík power distributor, Reykjavík

Italy
 Dipartimento di Fisica (LIVE), Università degli Studi di Cagliari
 San Petronio Basilica, Bologna
 Palazzo della Ragione, Padua
 Museo Nazionale della Scienza e della Tecnologia (Leonardo da Vinci), Milan
 Museo del Balì, Saltara
 Dipartimento di Scienze Fisiche, Università "Federico II", Naples
 Aula Magna of Liceo M. Curie, Tradate
 Liceo Scientifico Galileo Galilei (LIVE), Siena
 Liceo Scientifico Angelo Messedaglia, Verona

Latvia
Riga TV Tower - Within proposed renovations of the TV Tower, the intention is to build the world's largest Foucault pendulum with a weight of 500 kg and a length of over 70m. The construction is set to begin at the second half 2019.

Liechtenstein
In the staircase of the national  Gymnasium Vaduz, combined with an artwork by Ferdinand Gehr  Drehung der Erde in ihrer Schlichtheit sichtbar

Lithuania
 Vilnius University - weight 34 kg, length 35 m (built in the 17th century belfry of Sts. Johns' Church of Vilnius University in 2011)

Luxembourg
 University of Luxembourg - Length: 16 m, weight 32 kg

Moldova
 Technical University of Moldova, Chişinău - Length: 19 m, Weight 155 kg (2006 - 1851 = 155)

Netherlands
 Radboud University Nijmegen
 Sint-Bavokerk in Haarlem

Norway
 Department of Physics, University of Oslo Weight: 32kg, Length: 14.1m
 Realfagbygget, NTNU (Norwegian University of Science and Technology) "Weight: 40kg, Length: 25m"
 Science Factory (Vitenfabrikken), Sandnes "Weight: 60kg, Length: 11,17m"

Poland
 Nicolaus Copernicus Museum Frombork - Length: 28 m, weight: 46.5 kg
 St. Peter and St. Paul's Church, Kraków - Length: 46.5 m, weight: 25 kg
 Polytechnic, Gdańsk - Length: 26 m, weight: 64 kg
 Centre for Science and Technology, Łódź - Length: 36 m, weight: around 100 kg
 Adam Mickiewicz University, Poznań
 Pomeranian Dukes' Castle, Szczecin
 Copernicus Science Centre, Warsaw
 Center for Modernity, Mill of Knowledge, Toruń - Length: 33 m, weight: 35 kg

Portugal
 National Natural History Museum and Science Museum, Lisbon University
 Department of Physics, FCT, University of Coimbra
 Pavilhão do Conhecimento, Parque das Nações, Lisbon
Centro Ciência Viva de Estremoz

Romania
 The oldest Foucault Pendulum in Romania is located in pavilion B of the University of Oradea. It was installed in 1964 by Prof. Coriolan Rus, the then dean of the Faculty of Mathematics - Physics. (length: 14m; weight: 60 kg)
 "Vasile Alecsandri" National College in Galați (length: 9,92m; weight: 8 kg)
 A. T. Laurian National College in Botoșani (length: 17,5m; weight: 25,6 kg)
 Gheorghe Asachi Technical University of Iași (length: 19,6m; weight: 28 kg; with electromagnetic drive unit)

Russia
 Moscow Planetarium
 Novosibirsk Planetarium
 Penza Planetarium
 Saint Isaac's Cathedral, Saint Petersburg (pendulum length was 98 m; removed in 1990s)
 Saint Petersburg Planetarium (length: 8 m)
 Smolensk Planetarium (length: 12 m)
 Volgograd Planetarium
 Institute of Geology Komi Sci. Center Ural Div. RAS, Syktyvkar (length: 17 m)
 Murmansk Regional Universal Scientific Library (length: 21 m; weight: 32 kg)

Serbia
 State University of Novi Pazar, Novi Pazar (length 17 m, weight 28 kg)

 Physics Laboratory Center of Technical Science Faculties of the University of Belgrade (length 9 m, weight 30 kg)

Spain
 Hall of the Faculties of Sciences, Universidad Autónoma de Barcelona - Length: 7 m, weight: 20 kg
 Parque de las Ciencias, Granada
 Cosmocaixa Museum, Alcobendas, Madrid
 Facultad de Física, Universidad de Salamanca
 CosmoCaixa Barcelona, Barcelona, Catalunya
 "Villanueva" Building, National Astronomical Observatory, Madrid
 Pabellón de la Energía Viva, Seville
 Casa de las Ciencias, A Coruña - Length: 14 m, weight: 125 kg
 Museu de les Arts i les Ciències Príncipe Felipe, Valencia - Length: 30 m
Hall of Faculty of Physics, Universidade de Santiago de Compostela, Santiago de Compostela

Sweden
 Xperimenthuset, Lokstallarna, Växjö - Weight: 32 kg
 Carlsunds utbildningscentrum, Motala, Sweden Weight: 13 kg, Length: 6 m, Theoretical pendulum day: 28h 3 min, Measured pendulum day: 26h 59 min
 Sandvikens Gymnasieskola, Sandviken Weight: 63 kg, Length: 9 m
 Fysikaliska Leksaker, Chalmers, Göteborg
 Ångströmslaboratoriet, Uppsala
 E.ON corporate office, Malmö. Weight: circa 900 kg

Switzerland
 Centro Professionale Biasca - Length: 15 m, weight: 102 kg
 Naturmuseum Solothurn, Solothurn
 Gymnasium Oberwil, Basel-Land
 Lycée cantonal de Porrentruy, Porrentruy, Jura

Ukraine
 Kyiv Polytechnic Institute, length: 22 m, weight: 43 kg

United Kingdom

 The Devonshire Dome, University of Derby, Buxton (Not a permanent feature - May be removed for special events.)
 The Grange School, Cheshire
 Science Faculty, Uppingham School, Rutland. Length 11.5m. 
 University of Liverpool Chemistry Department. Length 7.9m. Period 5.6s.
 Science Museum, London. Length 22.45m. Period 9.5s. 
 Manchester Conference Centre
 Harris Museum, Preston
 Cattermole Building, Kesteven and Sleaford High School, Sleaford
 HH Wills Physics Laboratory, University of Bristol, Bristol  (Currently removed; may be reinstalled)
 University of Warwick, Coventry
 Atrium of Thames House, headquarters of the British Security Service, in acknowledgement of Umberto Eco's "conspiracy" novel Foucault's Pendulum
 Princes Square shopping centre, Glasgow (Not operating)

Africa

South Africa 
 Giyani Science Centre, Giyani, Limpopo Province
 Department of Chemistry, University of Pretoria
 Natural Science Museum, Albany Museum Complex, Grahamstown
 Heritage Garden, Stellenbosch
 University Of Natal (Durban, Science Center Building)

Tunisia
 Cité des Sciences de Tunis

Asia

China
 Beijing Planetarium, Beijing
 Guangdong Science Center, Guangzhou

India
 B. M. Birla Planetarium and Science Museum, Jaipur
 Deen Dayal Upadhyay Gorakhpur University
 Inter-University Centre for Astronomy and Astrophysics, Pune
 Subir Raha Oil Museum, Tel Bhavan, ONGC, Dehradun
 Physical Research Laboratory, Ahmedabad, Gujarat
 Regional Science Centre, Near New Alipiri Gate, Tirupati, Andhra Pradesh
 Science Centre, Surat
 Regional Science Centre, Pilikula, Near Manglore, Karnataka

Iran
 University of Isfahan, Isfahan
 Sharif University of Technology, Tehran

Israel
 BGU, Beer Sheva
 Gitam/BBDO Ltd, Ramat Gan
 Givatayim Observatory, Givatayim
 Weizmann Institute, Rehovot

Japan
 National Science Museum of Japan, Tokyo
 Fukusai-ji (Fukusai Temple), or Nagasaki Kannon Universal Temple, Nagasaki
 Katsushika City Museum, Tokyo
 Tokyo DisneySea (in the Pendulum Room inside Fortress Explorations), Chiba
 Nagoya City Science Museum, Aichi
 Himeji City Science Museum, Himeji, Kobe
 Kyoto Youth Science Centre, Fuji-no-Mori, Kyoto
 Sapporo City Youth Science Center, Sapporo

Pakistan
 National Museum of Science and Technology, Lahore

Thailand
 Khonkaen University, Khon Kaen
 AstroPark, Chiang Mai

Turkey
 Bilkent University- Faculty of Science, Physics Department, Ankara
 EGE University, Izmir

North America 
Alphabetic by state or province, then place.

Canada

Mexico

United States

Central and South America

Argentina
 School of Natural Sciences, University of Buenos Aires, Buenos Aires, Argentina (Length: 27.35 m. Period: 10.4 secs)
 Museum of Science and Technology, Engineering School, University of Buenos Aires, Buenos Aires, Argentina
 Teatro Argentino de La Plata in La Plata, Argentina

Brazil
 Museu do Universo at the planetarium of Rio de Janeiro, Rio de Janeiro, Brazil
 PUCRS Museum of Science and Technology, Porto Alegre, Brazil

Chile
 Centro de Estudios Científicos, Costanera de la Ciencia, Valdivia, Chile
 Colegio San Francisco Javier, Puerto Montt, Chile
 Faculty of Physical and Mathematical Sciences, University of Chile, Santiago, Chile

Colombia
 Instituto Geográfico Agustín Codazzi in Bogotá, Colombia.

Puerto Rico
 Physics Department, University of Puerto Rico, Mayaguez, Puerto Rico

Venezuela
 Central Library of the Simón Bolívar University in Caracas, Venezuela

Australasia

Australia 
 Foucault pendulum, School of Physics, University of New South Wales
 Questacon National Science Exhibition, Canberra
 Gravity Discovery Centre Military Rd, Gingin, Western Australia
 School of Earth Sciences, The University of Melbourne, Melbourne
 School of Mathematics, Monash University, Melbourne, Victoria
 School of Physics, in the foyer of the Darling West building (previously named Bragg building), University of Adelaide, North Terrace, Adelaide, South Australia.
 Queensland Museum Sciencentre, Brisbane, Queensland
 School of Earth Sciences, University of Tasmania, Hobart.

New Zealand 
 College of Sciences, Massey University, Palmerston North, New Zealand

Antarctica 
 South Pole, Amundsen–Scott South Pole Station, in the cylindrical stairwell "beer can" - Length: 33 m, weight: 25 kg, quickest turning Foucault pendulum on earths land, not driven.

References 

Foucault pendulums, list of
Foucault pendulums